DNA-binding protein A is a protein that in humans is encoded by the CSDA gene.

References

Further reading

External links 
 
 

Transcription factors